Belgium men's national goalball team is the men's national team of Belgium. Goalball is a team sport designed specifically for athletes with a vision impairment.  The national team takes part in international competitions.

The team is also known as the Belgian Bulls as it is a tradition in Belgium to have animal names for national teams.

Paralympic Games

1976 Toronto 

The 1976 Summer Paralympics were held in Toronto, Canada.  The team was one of seven teams participating, and they finished fourth overall.

1980 Arnhem 

At the 1980 Summer Paralympics in Arnhem, Netherlands, thirteen teams took part.  The team finished fifth.

2008 Beijing 

The team came back to the international scene in the beginning of the 2000s and worked itself up to an international level. After coming back to the A-division in 2006, the team qualified in for the 2008 Summer Paralympics in Beijing, China, where they finished eleventh.

2012 London 

The team competed in the 2012 Summer Paralympics from 30 August to 7 September 2012, in London, England.  In Group B, they finished the round-robin in third place behind China and Iran.  The team was beaten by Brazil in the quarter-finals, 0:3, and finished in seventh overall place.

Group B round-robin

Semi-final

The team tried to qualify for the Rio 2016 games but missed out during the 2014 World Championships and IBSA World Games.

2020 Tokyo 

The team competed in the 2020 Summer Paralympics, with competition from Wednesday 25 August to finals on Friday 3 September 2021, in the Makuhari Messe arena, Chiba, Tokyo, Japan.  The team was selected for Tokyo 2020 following the 2018 World Championships in Malmö, Sweden.

Round-robin

World Championships

2018 Malmö 

The team competed in the 2018 World Championships from 3 to 8 June 2018, in Malmö, Sweden.  They confirmed their good level by winning the bronze at the Championships, and with this, they secured a ticket for the 2020 Tokyo Paralympic Games.

2022 Matosinhos 

The team competed in the 2022 World Championships from 7 to 16 December 2022, at the Centro de Desportos e Congressos de Matosinhos, Portugal.  There were sixteen men's and sixteen women's teams.  They placed fifth in Pool C, and tenth in final standings.

IBSA World Games

2015 Seoul  

The team competed in the 2015 IBSA World Games from 10 to 17 May 2015, in Seoul, South Korea.

Regional championships 

The team competes in the IBSA Europe goalball region.  Groups A and C are held one year, and Group B the following year.  Strong teams move towards Group A.

2013 Konya (Group A)  

The team competed in the 2013 IBSA Goalball European Championships, Group A, from 1 to 11 November 2013, at Konya, Turkey.  They beat Ukraine 5:3 to rank seventh in the overall standings.

2015 Kaunas (Group A) 

The team competed in the 2015 IBSA Goalball European A Championships in Kaunas, Lithuania.  They lost their quarter-final match against Czech Republic, 4:10.

2017 Pajulahti (Group A) 

The team competed in the 2017 IBSA Goalball European A Championships from 15 to 23 September 2017, at Pajulahti, Nastola, Finland.  The team took its first ever medal on an international level by winning the bronze at the Championships.

2019 Rostock (Group A) 

The team competed in the 2019 IBSA Goalball European A Championships from 5 to 14 October 2019, in Rostock, Germany.  In Pool B, they came third, winning two games of their four; finishing sixth overall.

See also 

 Disabled sports
 Belgium women's national goalball team
 Belgium at the Paralympics

References

Goalball men's
National men's goalball teams
Belgium at the Paralympics
European national goalball teams